Princess Bandhavanna Varobhas or Phra Chao Boromwongse Ther Phra Ong Chao Bandhavanna Varobhas (RTGS: Banthawan Warophat) (25 May 1875 – 15 May 1891), was a Princess of Siam (later Thailand). She was a member of the Siamese Royal Family. She was a daughter of Chulalongkorn, King Rama V of Siam.

Her mother was Chao Chom Manda Pae Bunnag (later elevated into Lady (Chao Khun Phra) Prayuravongse), daughter of Lord (Chao Phraya) Suravongs Vaiyavadhana (son of Somdet Chao Phraya Borom Maha Si Suriyawongse). She had 2 elder full sisters:
 Princess Srivalailaksana, the Princess of Suphanburi (24 July 1868 – 26 October 1904)
 Princess Suvabaktra Vilayabanna (2 May 1873 – 30 July 1930)

Princess Bandhavanna Varobhas died on 15 May 1891 at age 15, ten days before her 16th birthday.

Ancestry

1875 births
1891 deaths
19th-century Thai royalty who died as children
19th-century Chakri dynasty
Thai female Phra Ong Chao
Children of Chulalongkorn
Daughters of kings